The Capildeo family is an Indo-Trinidadian and Tobagonian family of Hindu pundits, politicians, and writers. The most notable members are 2001 Nobel laureate V. S. Naipaul and mathematician and politician Rudranath Capildeo.   
The ancestral home of the Capildeo family is known as Anand Bhavan ("The Lion House") and is in Chaguanas, Caroni County, Trinidad and Tobago.
No-one today knows how the name Kapil transformed into Capildeo. It is possible that Kapil added dev, meaning God, from his village's name of Mahadeva Dubey to his name. Transliteration from Hindi to English was not well developed in the 19th century and words were spelt differently then from the way they are now. Thus, Kapil was changed to Capil and dev to deo, giving Kapil's descendants the surname of Capildeo.

Family tree 

Pt. Raghunath Dubey
Pt. Capil Deo Dubey a.k.a. Pundit Capildeo (1873 – 1926)= Soogee Capildeo (née Gobin) (1880 – 1952) (daughter of Bharat Gobinda and Minnie Gobin)
Droapatie Naipaul (née Capildeo) (1913 –1991) = Seepersad Naipaul (1906 –1953)
Sati Bissoondath (née Naipaul) = Crisen (Krishen) Bissoondath
Neil Bissoondath (1955 – )
Kamla Tewari (née Naipaul) (1929 – 2009)
V. S. Naipaul (1932 – 2018) = Patricia Ann Naipaul (née Hale) †
V. S. Naipaul (1932 – 2018) = Nadira Naipaul (née Alvi) (1953 – )
Mira Naipaul Inalsingh (Enalsingh) = Amar Inalsingh (Enalsingh)
Aruna Inalsingh (Enalsingh)
Anil Inalsingh (Enalsingh)
Nisha Inalsingh (Enalsingh)
Savitri Naipaul-Akal 
Kiran Shiva Akal
Ashvin Rai Akal
Siri Shamin Akal
Shiva Naipaul (1945 – 1985) = Jenny Naipaul (née Stuart)
Tarun Naipaul (1974 – )
Nalini Naipaul Chapman
Simbhoonath Capildeo (1914 – 1990) = Indradai Capildeo (née Ramoutar) (1920 – 2009)
Sita Capildeo (1936 – 2019) = Watson 'Mac' Laetsch
John Laetsch
Charlie Laetsch
Krishen Laetsch
Devendranath Capildeo (1938 – 2003) = Leila Capildeo (née Bissoondath)
Kavi Capildeo (1969 – ) = Ratna (Ratnawalie) Capildeo (née Byragie)
Tej Capildeo (2002 – )
Kovid Capildeo (2006 – )
Vahni Capildeo (1973 – ) = David Simon Groiser (marriage dissolved)
Surendranath Capildeo (1940 – 2016) = Shakti Capildeo (née Maraj)
Preeti Capildeo
Priya Capildeo
Rudranath Capildeo (1920 – 1970) = Ruth Capildeo (née Goodchild)
Rudy Capildeo = Sandra Capildeo (née Melough)
Jamie Capildeo = Nina Capildeo (née Goswami)
Tatiana Loveday Capildeo and Montague Cato Capildeo
Rudy Capildeo = Rita Lucia Capildeo (née Campolini)
Rudy Charles Capildeo
Lucy Capildeo
Joseph Capildeo
Oliver Capildeo
Rudranath Capildeo (1920 – 1970) = Shirley Capildeo (née Gasteen) (1933 – 2007)
Anne Saraswati Gasteen Macdonald (née Capildeo) = Ken Macdonald
Andrew Neil Gasteen Macdonald
Catherine Louise Capildeo Macdonald
Dhanpatee (aka Dhan/Dhanpat) Permanand (née Capildeo) = Ramnarine Permanand
Owad Permanand
Radha Permanand
Rishi Permanand
Sachedanand "Sash" Permanand = Jean Angela Permanand
Rajpat Maharaj (née Capildeo) (1900 – 1944) = Aiknath Ramcharan Maharaj (1896 – 1960)
Kalawatee (Calawattee) Capildeo = Ramnarace Permanand
Rabindranath "Robbie" Permanand
Baidwatie Permanand
Chitrawatie Permanand
Sawatee Permanand
Ahilla Capildeo
Deo
Phoolo
Beena Capildeo
Tara Capildeo = Pundit Hargobin
Kunti (Kunta) Capildeo = Pundit Baboo
Boysie 
Ramdoolarie Capildeo = Dinanath (div.)
Bindmatee Capildeo = Satnarine Panday
Omkar Capildeo (died in infancy)

References 

Political families
Capildo
Naipaul family
Trinidad and Tobago families